The 2012 Shannons Nationals Motor Racing Championships season was the seventh time that the Shannons Nationals Motor Racing Championships were held. The season began on 9 March 2012 at Sydney Motorsport Park and finished on 25 November 2012 at Sandown Raceway.

The 2012 Australian Saloon Car Series, 2012 Australian Sports Sedan Championship, 2012 Australian Superkart Championship, 2012 Australian Suzuki Swift Series, 2012 Commodore Cup National Series, 2012 Kumho V8 Touring Car Series and the 2012 Porsche GT3 Cup Challenge Australia were all held exclusively on the Shannons Nationals calendar. Rounds of the 2012 Australian Drivers' Championship, 2012 Australian GT Championship, 2012 Australian Manufacturers' Championship, 2012 Radical Australia Cup and the 2012 Touring Car Masters season were also part of the Shannons Nationals schedule.

Calendar and round winners

Series champions

References

2012 in Australian motorsport